This is a list of the albums ranked number one in the United States during 2019. The top-performing albums and EPs in the United States are ranked on the Billboard 200 chart, which is published by Billboard magazine. The data is compiled by Nielsen SoundScan based on each album's weekly physical and digital sales, as well as on-demand streaming and digital sales of their individual tracks.

Multiple artists received their first number-one album in 2019, including: 21 Savage, A Boogie wit da Hoodie, Hozier, Juice Wrld (which would be his last released during his lifetime following his death later in the year), Nav, Billie Eilish, Khalid, Tyler, the Creator, The Raconteurs, Young Thug, Luke Combs, DaBaby, SuperM, YoungBoy Never Broke Again, Trippie Redd, and Roddy Ricch.

The year also featured many artists return to the number-one spot after years of absence: the band Tool released their first number-one album in 13 years, the Jonas Brothers released their first in 10 (becoming the third consecutive number-one for both artists), the Backstreet Boys released their first album in 6 years, and their first number-one since 2000, and Celine Dion had her first number-one since 2002. Billie Eilish's debut album When We All Fall Asleep, Where Do We Go? was the best performing album of 2019. Taylor Swift's seventh studio album, Lover, was the best-selling album of 2019, and had the year's biggest sales week with 867,000 units.

Chart history

See also
 2019 in American music
 List of Billboard Hot 100 number ones of 2019

References

2019
United States Albums